Vesyoloyarsk is a rural locality (a selo) and the administrative center of Vesyoloyarsky Selsoviet, Rubtsovsky District, Altai Krai, Russia. The population was 4,940 as of 2013. There are 26 streets. It is located by the adjacent to the Kazakhstan–Russia border.

Geography 
Vesyoloyarsk is located 27 km south of Rubtsovsk (the district's administrative centre) by road. Lokot and Novoaleksandrovka are the nearest rural localities.

References 

Rural localities in Rubtsovsky District